Tommaso d'Ancora, C.R. or Tommaso d'Ariconi (1583–1656) was a Roman Catholic prelate who served as Archbishop of Trani (1635–1656) and Bishop of Mottola (1630–1634).

Biography
Tommaso d'Ancora was born in Salerno, Italy in 1583 and ordained a priest in the Congregation of Clerics Regular of the Divine Providence. On 12 February 1630, he was selected as Bishop of Mottola and confirmed by Pope Urban VIII on 9 September 1630. On 15 September 1630, he was consecrated bishop by Laudivio Zacchia, Cardinal-Priest of San Pietro in Vincoli, with Francesco Maria Brancaccio, Bishop of Capaccio, and Martín de León Cárdenas, Bishop of Trivento, serving as co-consecrators. On 21 July 1634, he was selected as Archbishop of Trani and confirmed by Pope Urban VIII on 8 January 1635. He served as Archbishop of Trani until his death in 1656.

Episcopal succession
While bishop, d'Ancora was the principal co-consecrator of:
Pietro Corsetto, Bishop of Cefalù (1638); and
Jacobus Philippus Tomasini, Bishop of Novigrad (1642).

References

External links and additional sources
 (for Chronology of Bishops)}
 (for Chronology of Bishops)}
 (for Chronology of Bishops)}
 (for Chronology of Bishops)

17th-century Italian Roman Catholic archbishops
Bishops appointed by Pope Urban VIII
1583 births
1656 deaths
Archbishops of Trani
Theatine bishops
People from Salerno